Ken Hanson may refer to:

 Ken Hanson (academic) (born 1953), associate professor in the University of Central Florida Judaic Studies Program
 Ken Hanson (cyclist) (born 1982), American cyclist